For São Vicente's main port, see Porto Grande, Cape Verde

Porto Grande (Portuguese: Grand Harbor) is a municipality located in the southeast of the state of Amapá in Brazil. Its population is 22,452 and its area is 4,425 km².

Overview
Porto Grande became an independent municipality in 1993. It has a tropical rainforest climate with a short dry season. 

The area around Porto Grande was first explored by gold miners, however nowadays it has become one of the biggest food producers in Amapá. It is a poor region where many homes do not have sewage system, and a quarter of the population does not have access to clean drinking water, however Porto Grande has one of the lowest illiteracy rates of Brazil.

The Annual Pineapple Festival in September is a popular tourist attraction. Other attractions are the spa near the Araguari River. As of 2021, a regional hospital was being constructed in Porto Grande.

Nature
The municipality contains 7.72% of the  Amapá State Forest, a sustainable use conservation unit established in 2006.

Economy
Porto Grande is a major fruit producer in particular pineapples and oranges. Other economic activities are livestock like cattle, buffalo and pig, palm oil and pine plantations.

Transport
Porto Grande is connected to the BR-156, and the BR-210 highways.

Neighboring municipalities
Ferreira Gomes, north and northeast
Macapá, southeast
Santana, southeast
Mazagão, southwest
Pedra Branca do Amapari, northeast
Serra do Navio, northwest

References

External links
Official website 

Municipalities in Amapá
Populated places in Amapá